Killian Hill Christian School is a private Christian school located in Lilburn, Georgia, United States, that provides K–12 education. 

Killian Hill has been ranked in the top 10 for private high school education in the Atlanta area.  The school has also earned an A+ rating for diversity.

History
Killian Hill Christian School was established in 1972 as an extension of Killian Hill Baptist Church. The buildings on the property are used for the purposes of both the church and the school.

Academics
None

References

External links
 Killian Hill Christian School official website

Christian schools in Georgia (U.S. state)
Schools in Gwinnett County, Georgia